Aliabad (also Romanized as ‘Alīābād; also known as Yariābād) is a village in Dashtabi-ye Gharbi Rural District, Dashtabi District, Buin Zahra County, Qazvin Province, Iran. At the 2006 census, its population was 352, in 90 families.

References 

Populated places in Buin Zahra County